The Spice Girls are an English girl group that consists of Mel B, Emma Bunton, Geri Horner, Melanie C and Victoria Beckham. The following is a list of songs by the group.

Recorded songs

See also
 Spice Girls discography

References

Spice Girls